McArthur Lake is a reservoir in Boundary County, Idaho, USA. It gives its name to the McArthur Lake Wildlife Corridor, which provides a bridge for wildlife to migrate between two mountainous areas. The reservoir and surrounding wetlands are rich in bird life, and are protected by the McArthur Lake Wildlife Management Area. There has been discussion about removing the dam that impounds the reservoir, which would improve the wetlands so they would support larger numbers of game birds, and would also improve the quality of water downstream.

Location

McArthur Lake is a reservoir in Boundary County, Idaho.
The area is popular for activities such as hunting, fishing and hiking.
The lake is in the McArthur Lake Wildlife Corridor, which forms a route between the Selkirk and Cabinet mountains, and is used by species such as grizzly bear, elk and wolverine to reach the Idaho Panhandle and the Kootenai National Forest.
The corridor connects the Selkirk and Cabinet-Yaak grizzly bear recovery zones.

Highway 2/95 from Sandpoint to Bonners Ferry runs past the east shore.
As of 2009 about 6,600 vehicles crossed the wildlife corridor daily on the highway.
It was the top place for wildlife collisions in the state, with 34 collisions in 2007.

Hydrology

The reservoir impounds Deep Creek, which enters at the southwest end and leaves from the northeast, and is also fed from the northwest by Dodge Creek.
The spillway includes a fish ladder, which helps preserve the fish population for recreational fishing on the reservoir.
The fish ladder includes a sloping channel beside the spillway, with a series of low steps above it leading to the dam.

The impoundment has seriously affected the creek's water quality.
Idaho’s Clean Water Act Section 303(d) includes the creek on the list of impaired waters due to excessive sediment and elevated temperatures.
In 2017 Idaho Fish & Game (IDFG) stated that no decision had been made to remove the dam, but this was being considered as a way to both improve the wetlands so more waterfowl would be available for hunting, and to improve Deep Creek water quality.

Fish

McArthur Lake is shallow, with warm waters.
Recreational fishing is mainly limited to warm water species: perch, largemouth bass and pumpkinseed. 
Tributaries above the dam are used for spawning by wild adfluvial redband trout from Kootenay Lake, British Columbia.
The warm water of the reservoir may raise the mortality levels of juvenile fish migrating downstream.
There are restrictions on boating with the purpose of protecting aquatic vegetation and nesting birds.
This limits access to anglers. 
The reservoir is drained periodically so that vegetation can be controlled and waterfowl production improved. 
Drainage of the reservoir reduces the population of perch, but allows the surviving fish to grow larger.

Wildlife management area

Observed wildlife include 22 species of fish, 7 species of amphibians, 6 species of reptiles, 45 species of mammals, and more than 223 species of birds.
Birds include raptors, shorebirds, songbirds, upland birds, waterbirds and waterfowl.
In the spring and fall it is a resting place for Canada geese, American wigeon, mallard, green-winged teal, lesser scaup, common goldeneye and bufflehead.
In late summer the site is home to American white pelican and shorebirds such as killdeer, Wilson's snipe, greater yellowlegs, long-billed dowitcher, western sandpiper, spotted sandpiper and solitary sandpiper.
Nesting birds include veery, Swainson's thrush, Vaux's swift and bald eagle.

Notes

Citations

Sources

Reservoirs in Idaho